Janis Louise Kelly (born March 20, 1971 in Winnipeg, Manitoba) is a retired volleyball player from Canada.

She competed for her native country at the 1996 Summer Olympics in Atlanta, Georgia. There she finished in 10th place with the Women's National Team. She competed at the  2002 FIVB Volleyball Women's World Championship in Germany.

References
Canadian Olympic Committee

Specific

External links
 

1971 births
Living people
Black Canadian sportswomen
Canadian women's volleyball players
Olympic volleyball players of Canada
Volleyball players from Winnipeg
Volleyball players at the 1996 Summer Olympics
Pan American Games bronze medalists for Canada
Pan American Games medalists in volleyball
Volleyball players at the 1995 Pan American Games
Medalists at the 1995 Pan American Games